Cannabinodiol (CBND), also known as cannabidinodiol, cannabinoid that is present in the plant Cannabis sativa at low concentrations. It is the fully aromatized derivative of cannabidiol (CBD) and can occur as a product of the photochemical conversion of cannabinol (CBN).

See also 
 Cannabidiol
 Cannabinol
 Cannabichromene
 Cannabimovone
 Delta-6-CBD
 Dimethylheptylpyran
 HU-210
 Nabilone
 Parahexyl
 Tetrahydrocannabivarin

References 

Cannabinoids
Natural phenols
2,6-Dihydroxybiphenyls
Alkyl-substituted benzenes